Aroli   is a village of Pappinisseri Panchayat in Kannur district in the Indian state of Kerala.

This village is located completely on hilltop towards Northeast of Kalliasseri.  Aroli village borders the villages of Pappinisseri, Kalliasseri and Anthoor, the Valapattanam River and NH-17 in Kannur District of North Malabar region in Kerala.

Geography
It has an average elevation of 1 metres (3 feet).

Demographics
According to the 2001 India census, Aroli had a population of 5,537.

Etymology
In ancient days, the area of Aroli was full of Arali flowers.  The name Aroli is believed to have been gained by this place due to the thick growth of this flower.

History

During Kolathiri, Aroli  was under reign of Nayanars of Kalliasseri. Along with others, Tippu Sultan, during his invasion to North Malabar destroyed monuments and temples of Aroli too. During the rule of British this place was under Chirakkal Taluk of Malabar District in Madras Presidency. Presently this is a village of Pappinisseri Panchayat in Kannur District of Kerala.

Culture

Aroli is famous for:
 Sree Vadeswaram Shiva Temple ,
 Mankadavu Juma Masjid,
 Keecheri Paalottu Kavu,
 Chalil Juma Masjid
 Naadacheri Bhagawathi Kavu
 Chittothidam Temple
 Kalloori Kavu
 Kalloori Kathivanoor Veeran devasthanam
 Arayala Temple                                                            
 Melchira Kottam                       
 Urpazashi Vettaikorumakan kshetram               
 Kallaikkal Juma Masjid

Sree Vadeswaram Shiva Temple

This temple is situated on Vadeswaram Hill.  This temple have a speciality that this is the only temple in Kerala having 'Ashtadhala Sreekovil' and hence it has become very famous Siva Temple of the region. The temple is built on top of this hill which looks like a mountain and hence known as 'Sree Kailasam' of North Malabar.  The temple is under Chirakkal Devaswom Board.

Mankkadavu Juma Masjid

Mankkadavu Juma Masjid is a very famous Mosque among North Malabar Muslim society.  The Mosque is at Mankkadavu on Aroli-Parassinikkadavu road, around 16 km from Kannur, 12 km and from Taliparamba.

Pappinisseri is the nearest rail head (Nearest Major Railway Station is Kannur). Kozhikode (Calicut) Airport is the nearest airport.  Kannur Airport is under construction near Mattannur.

Keecheri Paalottu Kavu

Keecheri Paalottu Kavuis a very famous Temple of Aroli.  Thousands of people from neighbouring villages also participates in the Annual Vishu Vilakkulsam of this Temple.   This Temple is situated near Keecheri on NH-17, around 13 km from Kannur, 11 km and from Taliparamba.

Kozhakkat Chuzhali Bhagawathy kshethram

Kozhakkat Chuzhali Bhagawathy kshethram is a very famous Temple of Aroli.  It is taken care by Kozhakkat Dharma Daiva Samstapana Samithi (KDDSS), a committee by members of kozhakkat tharavad. Mahanavami is the main festival in this temple with poojas on all the 9 days. The Ulsavam is scheduled on Ambalam Prathishta Day, i.e. Medam 9 of Malayalam calendar. 
The temple opens on all samkramam days and Sundays for Pooja

Pappinisseri is the nearest rail head (Nearest Major Railway Station is Kannur). Kozhikode (Calicut) Airport is the nearest airport.  Kannur Airport is under construction near Mattannur.

Transportation
The national highway passes through Dharmashala junction.  Mangalore and Mumbai can be accessed on the northern side and Cochin and Thiruvananthapuram can be accessed on the southern side.  The road to the east connects to Mysore and Bangalore.   The nearest railway stations are Kannapuram and Kannur on Mangalore-Palakkad line. There are airports at  Kannur, Mangalore and Calicut. All of them are international airports but direct flights are available only to Middle Eastern countries.

References

Villages near Dharmashala, Kannur